Stefania is a genus of tree frogs.

Stefania may also refer to:

 Stefania (name), a female name
 Stefania, Greater Poland Voivodeship, a village in west-central Poland
 Stefania, Łódź Voivodeship, a village in central Poland
 Stefania (crater), a crater on Venus
 Stefania (song), a song by Kalush Orchestra, which won the 2022 Eurovision Song Contest
 Stefania (singer) (b. 2002), a Greek-Dutch singer

See also 
 Stephanie (disambiguation)
 Stefan (disambiguation)
 Stephen (disambiguation)